Madame du Barry is a 1928 MGM short silent fictionalized film short in two-color Technicolor. It was the eighth film produced as part of Metro-Goldwyn-Mayer's "Great Events" series, and the last to be released before the new year.

Production
The film was shot at the Tec-Art Studio in Hollywood.

Preservation Status
Madame du Barry has not survived in its original two-reel form. 800 feet of 35mm material from the second reel has been preserved by the Library of Congress in Washington, DC.

References

External links 

1928 films
American silent short films
Metro-Goldwyn-Mayer short films
Silent films in color
Cultural depictions of Louis XV
Cultural depictions of Madame du Barry
Biographical films about French royalty
Films set in the 18th century
Films set in France
Works about Louis XV
1920s American films